Mikloško (feminine Miklošková) is a Slovak surname. Notable people with the surname include:

 František Mikloško (born 1947), Slovak politician
 Luděk Mikloško (born 1961), Czech football player and coach

Slovak-language surnames
Patronymic surnames